Dendrograptidae is an extinct family of graptolites.

Genera
List of genera from Maletz (2014):

†Airograptus Ruedemann, 1916
†Aspidograptus Bulman, 1934
? †Cactograptus Ruedemann, 1908
†Callograptus Hall, 1865
†Calyxdendrum Kozłowski, 1960
†Capillograptus Bouček, 1957
†Dendrograptus Hall, 1858
†Denticulograptus Schmidt, 1939
†Desmograptus Hopkinson in Hopkinson & Lapworth, 1875
†Dictyonema Hall, 1851
†Graptolodendrum Kozłowski, 1966
†Licnograptus Ruedemann, 1947
†Odontocaulis Lapworth, 1881
†Ophigraptus Jaeger, 1992
†Ophiograptus Poulsen, 1937
†Pseudocallograptus Skevington, 1963
†Pseudodictyonema Bouček, 1957
†Ptilograptus Hall, 1865
†Ptiograptus Ruedemann, 1908
†Rhabdinopora (†Dictyograptus) Paškevičius, 2011
†Rhizograpsus Spencer, 1878
? †Ruedemannograptus Termier & Termier, 1948
†Stelechiocladia Počta, 1894
†Streptograptus Ruedemann, 1947
†Zigzagigraptus Yu, 1962

References

Graptolites
Prehistoric hemichordate families